5-Methyl-7-methoxyisoflavone, commonly referred to simply as methoxyisoflavone, is a chemical compound marketed as a bodybuilding supplement. However, there is no meaningful clinical evidence to support its usefulness. A study published in 2006 examined the effect of methoxyflavone on training adaptations and markers of muscle anabolism and catabolism. No measurable effects were observed in athletic performance or in levels of testosterone and cortisol.

Consumption of 5-methyl-7-methoxyisoflavone can produce false positive results in urinary tests for cannabinoid use.

References

External links 
 

O-methylated isoflavones
Bodybuilding supplements